Agniphera, also known as Agnifera, is an Indian television series that premiered on &TV from 20 March 2017. In the beginning, the series starred Yukti Kapoor, Simaran Kaur and Ankit Gera as the leads from 2017 to 2018. Due to a generation leap in 2018, the series then starred Kapoor, Kaur, Karan Goddwani and Samridh Bawa. The series ended on 25 January 2019.

Plot
MBA graduate Anurag Singh returns to his hometown Bihar after completing his studies in London. His parents have different choices as to who would become his future wife. Vidvaan wants him to marry lawyer Purushottam Singh's daughter Srishti, but Revati wants him to marry the rich thug Vikraal Singh's spoiled daughter Ragini. However, Anurag decides to marry Srishti, and that enrages Ragini. On the wedding day, Vikraal holds Vidvaan at gunpoint and forcefully makes Anurag marry Ragini. To prevent insults, Srishti marries Anurag's mentally disabled younger brother Vishesh, and soon is taunted for being a middle-class girl by Revati and her niece Dulari, who try to sabotage her studies.

Slowly, Anurag begins loving Ragini. Srishti's friend and obsessed lover, Shekhar Sharma, tries to ruin her marriage by misleading the family that they're having an affair. Shrishti and Ragini expose Shekhar, who gets arrested for attempting to kill Vishesh. Ragini and Anurag realise their love and remarry. Rajjo enters for revenge. She turns out to be Vishesh's first wife, who married him in childhood, but as he got mentally disabled due to head injury, she was assumed to be bad luck on him and thrown out. Due to this humiliation, Rajjo's father commits suicide and her mother loses her sanity. In present, Rajjo is arrested and Revati finally accepts Srishti and Ragini.

Later, a hitman tries to kill Srishti. Vishu saves her and fights him, but dies in the process after falling off a cliff, and his body isn't found. Baiju Kanpuria, a goon troubles Srishti for slapping him publicly. Later, the family hires him as Srishti's bodyguard. They are assumed having affair and get married forcibly. Ragini is pregnant. Srishti and Baiju eventually fall in love. They meet a man who resembles Vishesh, and assume that he's an alive Vishesh. Revati vows to unite them but Srishti loves Baiju.

Later it is revealed that Vishesh is dead, and the man with his face who wants to separate Baiju and Srishti is actually Shekhar, who escaped jail and went through plastic surgery on his face. He kills Baiju and sends Ragini to jail by falsely accusing her, who in prison later delivers and gives her daughter in adoption. After finding out the truth, Srishti kills Shekhar but also dies after delivering her and Baiju's daughter, who is taken to Anurag's family.

20–22 years later
Srishti's daughter Sakshi is grown-up as like as Ragini's daughter Agni, who lives with her foster mom and finally learns about a late Ragini being her mother. Both Sakshi and Agni fall in love with Kishan Thakur, who loves Agni but Sakshi forcefully weds him. Agni eventually moves on and falls in love with lawyer Sameer, Kishan's cousin, and they get married.

Cast

Main
 Yukti Kapoor in dual roles 
 Ragini Singh – Vikraal and Radha's daughter; Abhimanyu's ex-fiancé; Parag's sister; Anurag's wife; Agni's mother (2017–18) (Dead)
 Agni Singh Thakur – Ragini and Anurag's daughter; Raksha's adopted daughter; Sakshi's adopted cousin sister; Kishan's ex-fiancé; Sameer's wife (2018–19)
 Simaran Kaur in dual roles 
 Srishti Singh Kanpuria – Purushottam and Maithili's daughter; Anurag's ex-fiancée; Vishesh's widow; Baiju's wife; Sakshi's mother (2017–18) (Dead)
 Sakshi Kanpuria Thakur – Srishti and Baiju's daughter; Singhs' adopted daughter; Agni's adopted cousin sister; Kishan's wife (2018–19)
 Ankit Gera as Anurag Singh – Vidvaan and Revati's elder son; Vishesh's brother; Baiju's adopted brother; Dulari's cousin; Srishti's ex-fiancé; Ragini's husband; Agni's father (2017–18) (Dead)
 Mohak Khurana as Vishesh "Vishu" Singh – Vidvaan and Revati's younger son; Anurag's brother; Baiju's adopted brother; Dulari's cousin; Rajjo's ex-husband; Srishti's late husband (2017–18) (Dead)
 Ayaz Ahmed as Baiju Kanpuria – Don; Vidvaan and Revati's adopted son; Anurag and Vishesh's adopted brother; Srishti's husband; Sakshi's father (2017–18) (Dead)
 Karan Goddwani as Kishan Thakur – Darshan and Savitri's son; Sameer's cousin; Agni's ex-fiancé; Sakshi's husband (2018–19)
 Samridh Bawa as Sameer Thakur – Lawyer; Danveer and Vaidehi's son; Kishan's cousin; Agni's husband (2018–19)

Recurring
 Amita Choksi as Revati Singh – Vidvaan's widow; Anurag and Vishesh's mother; Dulari's aunt; Baiju's foster mother; Agni's grandmother; Sakshi's adoptive grandmother (2017–19)
 Sunil Singh as Vidvaan Singh – Brijbhan's brother; Purushottam's best friend; Revati's husband; Anurag and Vishesh's father; Baiju's foster father; Agni's  grandfather; Sakshi's adoptive grandfather (2017–18)
 Divay Dhamja / Mohak Khurana as Shekhar Sharma – Srishti's former friend and obsessed lover (2017–18)
 Ibrar Yakub as Brijbhan Singh – Vidvaan's brother; Rajjo's lover (2017–18)
 Shakti Singh as Purushottam Singh – Vidvaan's best friend; Maithili's husband; Srishti's father; Sakshi's maternal grandfather (2017–18)
 Deepali Kamath as Maithili Singh – Purushottam's wife; Srishti's mother; Sakshi's  maternal grandmother (2017–18)
 Amit Koushik as Vikraal Singh – Radha's widower; Ragini and Parag's father; Agni's maternal grandfather (2017–18)
 Aamir S Khan as Parag Singh – Vikraal's and Radha's son; Ragini's brother; Anurag's brother-in-law (2017)
 Anuradha Singh as Dulari Singh – Revati's niece; Anurag and Vishesh's cousin  sister(2017–18)
 Ankit Bhetiwal as Mahesh "Mac" Kapoor – Anurag's friend (2017)
 Rehaan Roy as Abhimanyu Kapoor – Ragini's ex-fiancé (2018)
 Jyotsna Chandola as Rajjo Kaur Sandhu – Vishesh's former wife; Brijbhan's lover (2017)
 Prakash Pandit as Narad
 Vishesh Sagar as Baijujjj
 Rutpanna Aishwarya

Production

Casting
Yukti Kapoor was roped in to play the lead Ragini, with Ankit Gera as the male lead Anurag Singh. Simran Kaur and Mohak Khurrana were signed to play parallel leads Srishti and Vishesh Singh.

Besides the lead cast, Amita Choksi, Sunil Singh, Deepali Kamath, Shakti Singh and Amit Koushik were roped in to play parents' roles. In June 2017, Divay Dhamja entered as antagonist Shekhar Sharma though he quit two months later, with his character getting jailed.

In early 2018, Khurana's exit was planned, with his character's supposed death, and his parallel lead role was passed on to Ayaz Ahmed, who was zeroed in opposite Kaur as the gangster Baiju Kanpuria. In July 2018, Khurana rejoined the show by playing both his already alive character and Shekhar Sharma's returned changed face character, thus replacing Dhamja.

In September 2018, the series was planned and finalized to take a 20 year leap with Kapoor and Kaur's previous roles of Ragini and Srishti getting killed, while they were cast to portray their daughters Agni and Sakshi. Gera, Ahmed and Khurana's lead characters also were shown dead, which made them to exit, and Karan Goddwani was introduced as the new male lead Kishan Thakur in October 2018. In December 2018, Samridh Bawa also entered as Sameer Thakur.

References

2017 Indian television series debuts
2019 Indian television series endings
&TV original programming
Hindi-language television shows
Indian drama television series
Indian romance television series
Indian television soap operas